Three August Nights is a live album by the progressive bluegrass band Northern Lights. After the departure of Jake Armerding, the band plays as quartet with guest fiddler, Vassar Clements. This would be the last album for Taylor Armerding, the only founding member remaining in the group.

Track listing
 Goodbye Old Pal (Monroe) 2:37
 Midnight Moonlight (P.Rowan) 7:43
 John Hardy (trad.) 3:58
 Hold Whatcha Got (J.Martin) 2:48
 Dixie Breakdown (Lunceford, Reno) 3:03
 Kinfolks in Carolina (Travis) 3:06
 Rainmaker (Nicholson, P.Rowan) 5:46
 Northern Rail (T.Armerding) 4:56
 Wild Horses (Jagger, Richards) 4:31
 Got the Spirit (T.Armerding) 4:07
 Can't Buy Your Way (T.Armerding) 5:18
 Heartache Tonight (Frey, Henley, Souther) 3:32
 Dueling Banjos (Smith, Weissberg) 3:14
 T For Texas (Rodgers) 5:01

Personnel
 Taylor Armerding - mandolin, guitar, vocals
 Chris Miles - bass, vocals
 Bill Henry - vocals, guitar
 Mike Kropp - banjo, guitar

with
Vassar Clements - violin

References

External links
Official site

Northern Lights (bluegrass band) albums
2000 live albums